The women's 200 metre butterfly competition of the swimming events at the 1971 Pan American Games took place on 10 August.  The last Pan American Games champion was Claudia Kolb of US.

This race consisted of four lengths of the pool, all lengths being in butterfly stroke.

Results
All times are in minutes and seconds.

Heats

Final 
The final was held on August 10.

References

Swimming at the 1971 Pan American Games
Pan